"After the Fire Is Gone" is a song written by L. E. White, and recorded by American country music artists Loretta Lynn and Conway Twitty as a duet. It was released in January 1971 as the only single from the LP We Only Make Believe. "After the Fire Is Gone" was the first number one on the U.S. country chart for Lynn and Twitty as a duo. It spent two weeks at number one and a total of 14 weeks on the chart. On the Billboard Hot 100, the single peaked at number 56. It also won a Grammy for Grammy Award for Best Country Performance by a Duo or Group with Vocal.

In 1974, Willie Nelson and Tracy Nelson released a cover version which reached #17 on the country charts. Ricky Lynn Gregg released a version in 1994 from his album Get a Little Closer, but his version did not chart. On Willie's album To All the Girls... he sang the song with Leon Russell's daughter Tina Rose.

The song was recorded by Tanya Tucker on her 2010 album My Turn. A duet version was recorded by Allison Moorer and Steve Earle on the 2010 tribute album to Loretta, Coal Miner's Daughter.

Chart performance

Conway Twitty and Loretta Lynn

Willie Nelson and Tracy Nelson

References

1971 singles
1974 singles
Ricky Lynn Gregg songs
Tracy Nelson (singer) songs
Willie Nelson songs
Loretta Lynn songs
Conway Twitty songs
Songs written by L. E. White
Song recordings produced by Owen Bradley
Male–female vocal duets
Decca Records singles
1971 songs